The Big River is a tributary of the Coast Fork Willamette River, approximately  long, in western Oregon in the United States. It drains an area of the Calapooya Mountains south of Eugene.

Course
Box Canyon enters from the right at about river mile (RM) 9 or river kilometer (RK) 14. Big River receives Boulder Creek from the left, then Edwards Creek enters from the right at about RM 6 (RK 10).

See also
List of rivers of Oregon

References

External links

Rivers of Oregon
Rivers of Lane County, Oregon
Rivers of Douglas County, Oregon